Héloïse Jeanne Pelletier, also known as Jane Pierny, (2 April 1869 - 9 May 1913) was a French lyric soprano.

She studied with Saint-Yves Bax, a singing teacher at the Paris Conservatory. She made her debut in François les Bas-bleus, at the Théâtre des Menus-Plaisirs, where she sang in the First Arms of Louis XV, the Belle Sophie, the Little Bride, and the Egyptian. She moved to Théâtre des Nouveautés, where she played in the Girl of the Phone, Nini Fauvette, Champignol, My Prince, the Grimaces of Paris and the Capitol. She left the Théâtre des Nouveautés, and then moved to the Folies-Dramatiques.

In 1896, she sang "libertine songs" to illustrate Maurice Lefevre's lectures at the Bodinière and at the St. Petersburg Aquarium Theatre during the summer.

She performed at the Empire Theatre in 1896, at the Apollo in Berlin in September 1899; at the Kristowski Summer Theatre in St. Petersburg, the Metropol-Theater in Berlin and the Theater an der Wien in 1900.

In 1905, Jane Pierny left operetta and sang at Les Deux-Masques.

References 

1869 births
1913 deaths
French women singers